Dennis Kim, better known by his stage name Denizen Kane, is an underground rapper and spoken word artist. Denizen Kane is co-founder of the underground rap crew Typical Cats, with fellow MCs Qwazaar and Qwel, and producers / DJs Kid Knish and DJ Natural. He is also a founding member of Asian-American spoken word group I Was Born with Two Tongues.

Discography
Albums
 Typical Cats (2001) (with Typical Cats)
 Broken Speak (2003) (with I Was Born with Two Tongues)
 Civil Service (2004) (with Typical Cats)
 Tree City Legends Volume 2: My Bootleg Life (2005)
 Brother Min's Journey to the West (2009)
 3 (2012) (with Typical Cats)

EPs
 Tree City Legends (2002)
Compilations
 Typical Bootlegs Volume 1 (2004) (with Typical Cats)

Singles
 "Easy Cause It Is" (2004) (with Typical Cats)

References

External links
 Denizen Kane at Galapagos4
 Denizen Kane on Discogs

American male rappers
American rappers of Asian descent
Living people
Rappers from Chicago
Underground rappers
21st-century American rappers
21st-century American male musicians
Year of birth missing (living people)